Major General (Retd) Mahmudul Hasan is a Bangladesh Nationalist Party politician and the former Member of Parliament from Tangail-5.

Career
Hasan retired from Bangladesh Army as a Major General. He served in the Cabinet of President Hossain Mohammad Ershad as the Home Minister.

Hasan was elected to Parliament on 29 December 2012 from Tangail-5 in a by-election. The by-election was called after the Bangladesh Election Commission cancelled the election of Jatiya Party MP Abul Kashem.

He is also the founder of Major-general Mahmudul Hasan Ideal College, Tangail.

References

Bangladesh Nationalist Party politicians
Living people
9th Jatiya Sangsad members
Bangladesh Army generals
8th Jatiya Sangsad members
4th Jatiya Sangsad members
Year of birth missing (living people)
People from Tangail District
6th Jatiya Sangsad members